Garment collars in  are diverse and come in several shapes, including  (cross-collars, overlapping collars at the front which closed on the right or left sides), .

Cultural significance

/ right lapel 

The  closure is a style which originated in China and can be traced back to the Shang dynasty. The  is also an important symbol of the Han Chinese ethnicity. The  closure was eventually adopted by other ethnic minorities and was also spread to neighbouring countries, such as Korea and Japan.

/ left lapel 

This can also be found in the chapter  《》of the 《》:

According to ancient Chinese beliefs, the only moment the Han Chinese were supposed to use  was when they dressed their deceased.

Therefore, according to the Yin and Yang theory, the left lapel of a garment needs to be found outside (which is in the form of  closure) to indicate that the power of the  aspect is suppressing the  aspect, which thus symbolizes the clothing of living people. It was therefore a taboo in Chinese clothing culture for a living person to wear clothing with a  closure.

Exceptions 
There are exceptions in which living Han Chinese would wear clothing with a  closure. For example, in some areas (such as Northern Hebei) in the 10th century, some ethnic Han Chinese could be found wearing left-lapel clothing. It was also common for the Han Chinese women to adopt left lapel under the reign of foreign nationalities, such as in the such as in the Yuan dynasty. The practice of wearing the  also continued in some areas of the Ming dynasty despite being a Han Chinese-ruled dynasty which is an atypical feature.

Association with ethnic minorities and foreigners 
 
The  closure was also associated with the clothing of non-Han Chinese, ethnic minorities, and foreigners in ancient times. Some ethnic minorities generally had their clothing closing in the -style according to what was recorded in ancient Chinese texts, such as the Qiang. As a result, the traditional way to distinguish between clothing of the "Barbarian" (i.e. non-Han Chinese), and Chinese clothing, was typically by looking at the direction of the collar. 

This can also be found in the Analects where Confucius himself praised Guan Zhong for preventing the weakened Zhou dynasty from becoming barbarians:

 
From the standpoint of the Huaxia culture,  was a way to reject refined culture and being turned into a barbarian.

 
By the Han dynasty, since Confucius himself was the first person to use the phrase  to refer to Non-Zhou dynasty people, this phrase became a common metaphor for primitiveness. When used by the ancient Chinese literati, the concept of  became a phrase, which held the symbolic of foreign people who were living a barbarous and civilized lifestyle; this concept also became a way to emphasize the customs differences between the Han people and other ethnic minorities and draw the line to distinguish who was were considered as civilized and barbarians. Of note, some non-Chinese ethnicity who adopted -style sometimes maintain their left lapels, such as the Khitans in the Liao dynasty.

Common types of collar

Cross-collars

() were cross-collars which overlapped on the front and closed on the right side following the  rule; they can also be described as cross-collar garments closing to the right side, or y-shaped collar as the collar looks similar to the alphabetic letter《y》. The  started to be worn in the Shang dynasty in China. This form of collar eventually became one of the major symbols of the Sino Kingdoms and eventually spread throughout Asia. Garments and attire which used  collar include: shenyi, jiaolingpao, mianfu, pienfu, diyi, dahu, tieli.

refers to the cross-collars which closes on the left side instead of the right side. They were typically used by Non-Han Chinese ethnicities in ancient China, but were also adopted by the Han Chinese in some circumstances, e.g. when they were ruled by non-Han Chinese rulers. Han Chinese women were also found sometimes found in the paintings of the Ming dynasty, which is an atypical feature. They were also used to dress the deceased of the Han Chinese.

Central front collars 
Collars which runs parallel and straight at the front are called duijin (对襟). Garments with duijin collars can either be closed at the centre front or be left opened in the front. They could be found with or without a high collar depending on the time period. Duijin could be used in garments and attire, such as beizi, banbi, beixin.

Round collars 
Round collars are called yuanling (圆领) or panling (盘领). In ancient China, clothing with round collars were typically introduced and/or influenced by foreign ethnicities, such as the Donghu, the Wuhu, and the foreigners from Central Asia, such as the Sogdians, and the Mongols, at different point in time. Yuanling can be overlapping to the right or closing at the front in the duijin manner. Yuanling could be used in garments and attire, such as yuanlingshan, yuanlingpao, panling lanshan, and wulingshan (无领衫).

Standing collars 

High standing collars in the Ming dynasty are referred as shuling (竖领) or liling (立领). They appeared by the late Ming dynasty. There were two main forms of high standing collars garments based on their types of lapels and closure.

Standing collar with right closure 
Clothing with shuling dajin (竖领大襟), also called liling dajin or shuling xiejin or liling xiejin, has a standing collar and a large lapel which closes on the right. The dajin placket is also called xiejin .

Standing collar with central front closure 
Clothing with shuling duijin (or liling (or shuling) duijin) has a standing collar and closes with a central front closure.

Other forms of collars

Lapel collars 
Fanling refers to the lapel collars, typically categorized as Hufu-style collars

Square collars 
Square collars are referred as fangling (方领).

U-shaped collar 
U-shaped collar are known as tanling. Tanling could be used in garments and attire, such as tanling banbi and tanling ruqun.

Pipa-shaped collar 
Pianjin, also called Pipa-shaped collars and sometimes referred as 'slanted' collar in English, were form of collars which overlaps and closes to the right side with a big lapel. This form of collar was influenced by the Manchu clothing. The Manchu's front overlap opening was a Manchu innovation; their clothing was closed with buttons on the centre front of the neck, right clavicle, and under the right arm along the right seams. The Manchu overlap was more shaped like an S-curved overlap; it ran straight to the right of the centre-front of the neck, drops down to the burst before curving to the right side. The Manchu's garments rarely showed high collars until the 20th century. The Pip-shaped collar were worn in the Qing dynasty and the Republic of China. It could be found without or with a high collar (e.g. mandarin collar).

See also 

 Han Chinese clothing
 List of Han Chinese clothing
 Hufu

Notes

References 

Chinese traditional clothing